The men's 10,000 metres walk event at the 2004 World Junior Championships in Athletics was held in Grosseto, Italy, at Stadio Olimpico Carlo Zecchini on 17 July.

Medalists

Results

Final
17 July

Participation
According to an unofficial count, 31 athletes from 21 countries participated in the event.

References

10,000 metres walk
Racewalking at the World Athletics U20 Championships